Mount Hornaday el.  is a mountain peak in the northeast section of Yellowstone National Park in the Absaroka Range, Wyoming.  The peak was named in 1938 for naturalist William Temple Hornaday, a former director of the New York Zoological Gardens who championed the cause of saving the American Bison from extinction.

See also
 Mountains and mountain ranges of Yellowstone National Park

Notes

Mountains of Wyoming
Mountains of Yellowstone National Park
Mountains of Park County, Wyoming